The 2021 Big Ten Men's Ice Hockey Tournament was the eighth tournament in conference history. It was played between March 14 and March 16, 2021, at Compton Family Ice Arena in Notre Dame, Indiana. By winning the tournament, Minnesota earned the Big Ten's automatic bid to the 2021 NCAA Division I Men's Ice Hockey Tournament.

Format
All seven Big Ten teams will participate in the tournament, which will return to a single-elimination format for the first time since 2017. Due to the number of games postponed this season and the limited number of windows remaining to reschedule contests, the Big Ten Tournament seeding will be determined using the protocol for unbalanced schedules approved prior to the start of the season. Teams will be seeded No. 1 through No. 7 according to the final regular season conference standings, with the team that finishes first in the conference standings receiving a first-round bye.

Conference standings

Bracket

Note: * denotes overtime periods.

Results

Quarterfinals

(4) Notre Dame vs. (5) Penn State

(2) Minnesota vs. (7) Michigan State

(3) Michigan vs. (6) Ohio State

Semifinals

(1) Wisconsin vs. (5) Penn State

(2) Minnesota vs. (3) Michigan

Championship

(1) Wisconsin vs. (2) Minnesota

Tournament awards

All-Tournament Team
 G: Jack LaFontaine* (Minnesota)
 D: Mike Koster (Minnesota)
 D: Ty Emberson (Wisconsin)
 F: Cole Caufield (Wisconsin)
 F: Sampo Ranta (Minnesota)
 F: Sammy Walker (Minnesota)
* Most Outstanding Player

References

Big Ten Men's Ice Hockey Tournament
Big Ten Men's Ice Hockey Tournament